Robin Tanner may refer to:
 Robin Tanner (artist)
 Robin Tanner (minister)